Mohammad Ali Ramazani Dastak (23 April 1963 – 29 February 2020) was an Iranian politician who was elected to the Iranian Parliament in the 2020 election.

Biography
He also fought in the Iran–Iraq War. He died on 29 February 2020.  The cause of his death is disputed. The Iranian health ministry say it was due to influenza although other sources, including the BBC, have reported that he died from novel coronavirus.

References

1963 births
2020 deaths
Deaths from influenza
University of Tehran alumni
Imam Hossein University alumni
Islamic Revolutionary Guard Corps personnel of the Iran–Iraq War
Front of Islamic Revolution Stability politicians
Islamic Republican Party politicians
Iranian people of the Iran–Iraq War
Mojahedin of the Islamic Revolution Organization politicians
Iranian elected officials who did not take office
Deaths from the COVID-19 pandemic in Iran